Ayaviri may refer to the following in Peru:

 Ayaviri, Melgar, Puno region
 Ayaviri District, Melgar, Puno region
 Ayaviri, Yauyos, Lima region
 Ayaviri District, Yauyos, Lima region
 Territorial Prelature of Ayaviri